Mahmood Abdulqader Ali (born 4 October 1983), also known as Mahmood Salman, is a Bahraini handball player for Barbar Club and the Bahraini national team. He participated at the 2017 World Men's Handball Championship. He was part of the national team that won the bronze medal at the 2014 Asian Games and the silver medal in 2018.

References

1983 births
Living people
Bahraini male handball players
Asian Games medalists in handball
Asian Games silver medalists for Bahrain
Asian Games bronze medalists for Bahrain
Handball players at the 2002 Asian Games
Handball players at the 2006 Asian Games
Handball players at the 2014 Asian Games
Handball players at the 2018 Asian Games
Medalists at the 2014 Asian Games
Medalists at the 2018 Asian Games